Marcin Starzak (born 20 October 1985 in Kraków) is a Polish long jumper.

He finished sixth at the 2007 European Indoor Championships and seventh at the 2008 World Indoor Championships. He also competed at the 2005 European Indoor Championships, the 2006 European Championships, the 2007 World Championships and the 2008 Olympic Games without reaching the final. However, in 2009 Starzak claimed bronze in the European Indoor Championships, in Turin, Italy.

His personal best jump is 8.21 metres, achieved in July 2007 in Salamanca. His indoor best of 8.18 metres, set in Turin, is the Polish national record.

Achievements

References

1985 births
Living people
Polish male long jumpers
Athletes (track and field) at the 2008 Summer Olympics
Olympic athletes of Poland
Sportspeople from Kraków
Universiade medalists in athletics (track and field)
Universiade bronze medalists for Poland
Competitors at the 2007 Summer Universiade
Medalists at the 2009 Summer Universiade